Khaled Saleh may refer to:

 Khaled Al Saleh (born 1988), Syrian football player
 Khaled J. Saleh, American orthopedic surgeon
 Khaled Mohammed Saleh (born 2000), Qatari footballer